Scarve is a French technical death metal band from Nancy. They have released four full-length albums, the latest being The Undercurrent, released in 2007.

History 
Scarve was formed in 1994 by rhythm guitarist Patrick Martin and drummer Dirk Verbeuren, the latter of whom later joined Soilwork, and is now with renowned thrash metal band Megadeth. Their 2004 album, Irradiant features a contribution from Meshuggah guitarist Fredrik Thordendal on the track "Asphyxiate".

Vocalist departures and The Undercurrent 
In October 2006, it was announced that Guillaume Bideau had left Scarve during the recording of The Undercurrent in order to take over as lead singer in the Danish industrial metal band Mnemic. His session replacement was announced to be ex-Darkane singer, Lawrence Mackrory (who provided vocals on the album Rusted Angel).

Following the release of The Undercurrent, on 4 June, Pierrick Valence announced that he was leaving Scarve to focus on his other band, Phazm. On 22 April 2007, The band posted a message on their Myspace page saying that they were still looking for a vocalist. 

In May 2009, the band revealed their new vocalist, Lawrence Mackrory, who sung on The Undercurrent and their next album. Dirk said on their Myspace blog "We're all very proud and happy to have Lawrence in our ranks, and extremely excited to bring you, our fans, a whole new collection of blasting futuristic death metal!" 

Scarve has been on an unofficial hiatus since 2009, and have not performed live since 2007. Dirk Verbeuren currently performs with Megadeth and Sylvain Coudret is with Soilwork, while Loïc Colin recently joined American death metal band Solium Fatalis, which also features current members of Cryptopsy.

Members 

Current
 Lawrence Mackrory (Darkane) – vocals (2007, 2009–present)
 Patrick Martin – rhythm guitar (1994–present)
 Sylvain Coudret (Soilwork) – lead guitar (1994–present)
 Loïc Colin – bass guitar (2001–present)
 Dirk Verbeuren (Megadeth) – drums (1994–present)

Live members
 Gilles Delecroix – drums (2007)
 Butcho Vukovic – vocals (2007)
 Benoit Antonia – guitar (2004)

Former
 Alain Germonville – co-lead vocals (1998–2001)
 Guillaume Bideau (Mnemic) – co-lead vocals (1998–2006, died in 2022)
 Pierrick Valence – co-lead vocals (2001–2007)
 Fred Bartolomucci – vocals (1994–1998)
 Philipe Elter – bass guitar (1998–2001)
 David Fioraso – bass guitar (1994–1997)
 Julien Thibers – bass guitar (1997–1998)

Timeline

Discography 
Six Tears of Sorrow (1996, self-released)
Translucence (2000, War Music)
Luminiferous (2002, Listenable Records)
Irradiant (2004, Listenable Records)
The Undercurrent (2007, Listenable Records)

References

External links
Official website
Scarve at Listenable Records

French death metal musical groups
French groove metal musical groups
French thrash metal musical groups
Technical death metal musical groups
Musical groups established in 1994
1994 establishments in France
Listenable Records artists